Arthur Vaughan Johnson (February 2, 1876 – January 17, 1916) was a pioneer actor and director of the early American silent film era.

Career
Born in Cincinnati, Ohio, the son of Rev. Myron A. Johnson, Arthur Vaughan Johnson left college at 19 to join a traveling Shakespearean troupe. He later appeared on stage with Sol Smith Russell, Robert B. Mantell and Marie Wainwright. Johnson began as a film actor in 1905 with the Edison Studios in The Bronx, New York, appearing in the one-reel drama The White Caps directed by Wallace McCutcheon, Sr., and Edwin S. Porter. In 1908, he went to work for Biograph Studios, where he acted in films directed by D.W. Griffith including Resurrection (1909) and In Old California (1910), the first movie Griffith ever shot in Hollywood. At Biograph, Arthur Johnson performed with stars such as Mary Pickford and Florence Lawrence. Johnson was reputed to be Griffith's favorite actor.

In 1911 he accepted an offer from Lubin Studios in Philadelphia that allowed him to direct as well as act. With Lottie Briscoe, his frequent co-star at Lubin, Johnson directed and starred in The Belovéd Adventurer (1914), a 15 episode serial by Emmett Campbell Hall. After performing in more than three hundred silent film shorts and directing twenty-six, health problems ended his career in 1915.

Personal life
According to an interview published nine months before his death, Arthur V. Johnson married actress Maude Webb when he was 20 years old; the couple had a daughter who lived with Johnson's parents. Other sources indicate that around 1910 he married Florence Hackett, with whom he appeared in the 1913 film Power of the Cross. He died of tuberculosis in Philadelphia in 1916, a few weeks short of his fortieth birthday. Johnson's funeral services were held in Philadelphia and his remains later interred at Fairview Cemetery, Chicopee, Massachusetts. Nearby stands Grace Episcopal Church, where his father once served as rector.

Selected filmography

 The Adventures of Dollie (1908)
 The Fight for Freedom (1908)
 The Taming of the Shrew (1908)
 Romance of a Jewess (1908)
 The Bandit's Waterloo (1908)
 The Greaser's Gauntlet (1908)
 For a Wife's Honor (1908)
 The Girl and the Outlaw (1908)
 The Red Girl (1908)
 Where the Breakers Roar (1908)
 A Smoked Husband (1908)
 The Devil (1908)
 The Zulu's Heart (1908)
 Ingomar, the Barbarian (1908)
 The Vaquero's Vow (1908)
 The Planter's Wife (1908)
 Concealing a Burglar (1908)
 The Pirate's Gold (1908)
 The Guerrilla (1908)
 The Song of the Shirt (1908)
 The Ingrate (1908)
 A Woman's Way (1908)
 The Clubman and the Tramp (1908)
 The Call of the Wild (1908)
 The Valet's Wife (1908)
 The Feud and the Turkey (1908)
 The Reckoning (1908)
 The Test of Friendship (1908)
 The Christmas Burglars (1908)
 Mr. Jones at the Ball (1908)
 The Helping Hand (1908)
 One Touch of Nature (1909)
 The Honor of Thieves (1909)
 Love Finds a Way (1909)
 The Sacrifice (1909)
 The Criminal Hypnotist (1909)
 The Fascinating Mrs. Francis (1909)
 Mr. Jones Has a Card Party (1909)
 The Welcome Burglar (1909)
 The Road to the Heart (1909)
 A Sound Sleeper (1909)
 The Cord of Life (1909)
 The Girls and Daddy (1909)
 The Brahma Diamond (1909)
 Edgar Allan Poe (1909)
 A Wreath in Time (1909)
 A Rude Hostess (1909)
 Tragic Love (1909)
 The Golden Louis (1909)
 A Drunkard's Reformation (1909)
 Resurrection (1909)
 The Sealed Room (1909)
 The Hessian Renegades (1909)
 The Death Disc: A Story of the Cromwellian Period (1909)
 To Save Her Soul (1909)
 The Day After (1909)
 The Little Darling (1909)
 The Prussian Spy (1909)
 His Wife's Mother (1909)
 The Wooden Leg (1909)
 The Roue's Heart (1909)
 I Did It (1909)
 The Deception (1909)
 And a Little Child Shall Lead Them (1909)
 A Burglar's Mistake (1909)
 Two Memories (1909)
 Comata, the Sioux (1909)
 Pippa Passes (1909)
 Nursing a Viper (1909)
 All on Account of the Milk (1910)
 In Old California (1910)
 The Two Brothers (1910)
 A Romance of the Western Hills (1910)
 The Lily of the Tenements (1911)
 Divided Interests (1911)
 The Physician's Honor (1912)
 The Antique Ring (1912)
 Gingerbread Cupid (1912)
 A Matter of Business (1912)
 The Preacher and the Gossips (1912)
 The Spoiled Child (1912)
 A Child's Devotion (1912)

References

External links

American male film actors
American male silent film actors
American film directors
Male actors from Cincinnati
1876 births
1916 deaths
20th-century deaths from tuberculosis
Tuberculosis deaths in Pennsylvania
20th-century American male actors